And Winter Came... is the seventh studio album by Irish singer, songwriter, and musician Enya, released on 7 November 2008 by Warner Bros. Records internationally and by Reprise Records in the United States on 11 November 2008. After recording new Christmas songs for her fourth EP Sounds of the Season: The Enya Collection (2006), Enya started work on a Christmas album of traditional carols and original tracks, but the idea was changed to a collection of songs with a Christmas or winter theme as it better suited the style of the new material. It was recorded with her longtime collaborators, arranger and producer Nicky Ryan and his wife, lyricist Roma Ryan.

The album received mixed to positive reviews from music critics and became a worldwide success, reaching the top 10 in 21 countries in its first three weeks, including No. 8 on the US Billboard 200 and No. 6 on the UK Albums Chart. The track "Trains and Winter Rains" was the album's only physical single, and was followed by "Dreams Are More Precious", "White Is in the Winter Night", and "My! My! Time Flies!", released as digital downloads. To promote the album, Enya made several interviews, appearances, and live performances. The album has sold over 3 million copies worldwide.

Background and recording 
In November 2006, after her promotional tour for her previous studio album Amarantine (2005), Enya put out her fourth EP entitled Sounds of the Season: The Enya Collection, a Christmas-themed release containing new and previously released songs from the special Christmas edition of Amarantine, also released in the same month. For her next studio album Enya decided to record an album of Christmas music, a project that she had wanted to do for some time. She was inspired by the idea as winter is her favourite time of year, calling it "very reflective [...] very calming", during which she spends the most time developing sketches of music that she had put down throughout the year. Initially, Enya approached the project with the idea of combining tracks from the Sounds of the Season EP with some new material, but this was scrapped when an album of songs of a Christmas or winter theme was more attractive as the new music that Enya had developed suited it better. Nicky Ryan added that the album developed into one "based in a winter landscape where Christmas arrives here and there, but it would be wrong to call it an Enya Christmas album."

The album was recorded between 2006 and 2008 with Enya and her longtime collaborators, arranger and producer Nicky Ryan and his wife, lyricist Roma Ryan. It features ten original tracks with lyrics sung in English. As with her previous albums recording took place at Aigle Studio, the Ryans' home studio in Killiney, County Dublin.

Music and lyrics 
"And Winter Came..." is an instrumental and a rearranged version of "Midnight Blue", the B-side to "Wild Child", the second single from A Day Without Rain (2000). The majority of Enya's albums begin with a same-titled instrumental and she selected the title track as the opener because its themes "sets the mood of autumn going into winter". "Journey of the Angels" was written in the style of what Enya described as a "slow traditional carol", with Roma emphasising its religious aspect, and chose it as a personal highlight of the album. The song is dedicated to the American director and editor Tim Royes, who produced the music videos for Enya's songs "Amarantine" and "It's in the Rain" and died in 2007. For "White Is in the Winter Night", Enya was inspired by the idea of writing a "21st century Christmas carol", and pointed out Roma's lyrics that describe the various colours associated with Christmas time: "Green is in the mistletoe and red is in the holly ... Gold is in the candlelight and crimson in the embers". The album contains two traditional songs that were rearranged by Enya and Nicky; "O Come, O Come, Emmanuel" is an Advent Christian hymn that was introduced to Enya during her time in the choir at boarding school and became a longtime favourite of hers and Roma's, which inspired the decision to record it for the album. The song is sung in Latin. Enya described the meaning behind "Trains and Winter Rains": "The song ...] is like a dark winter journey and I think everybody has taken this journey where it's time to leave home. It's exciting but because it is the unknown, that's why we wanted to capture the little dark aspects in both the lyric and in the music." Roma compared "Dreams Are More Precious" to a "Christmas lullaby" and revealed its title was derived from the lyric that she wrote for the song.

"Last Time by Moonlight" is a romantic song that developed around the idea of two people who once loved each other having since split, and the reflection on one's life that could happen around Christmas time. Enya and Roma developed "One Toy Soldier" into a children's song about an old toy soldier with a broken drum that is a family's heirloom; despite its age it is still loved. Roma's initial set of lyrics had the story end with the toy soldier's future unclear on Christmas morning, but she knew Enya would not settle on such an ending, so she changed them accordingly to show the toy soldier was fine. "My! My! Time Flies!" was the last track recorded for the album. It is an uptempo song dedicated to the Irish guitarist Jimmy Faulkner, who died in March 2008. Its lyrics were based around a conversation that Enya and the Ryans had about Faulkner on a day surrounding his death and his favourite music. The track marks a departure from Enya's musical style in that it is her first song to use a steady drum track and her second song ever to include a prominent guitar solo, performed here by Pat Farrell, the first being "I Want Tomorrow" on Enya's first studio album from 1987. "Oíche Chiúin (Chorale)" is the album's second traditional song, and is Enya's first since A Day Without Rain that is sung in Irish, her first language. It is the Irish version of the Christmas carol "Silent Night", a favourite of Enya's since she first learned it as a child and sang with her school choir. Enya had previously recorded a version of the carol as a B-side to "Evening Falls...", the second single released from Watermark (1988). The decision to record a new version came from Nicky, who suggested more of a chorale arrangement and saw the track as a good opportunity to present Enya's voice as a choir, a wish of his since working with Enya. Roma added: "His little wish has come true. He has finally gotten Enya to sing it exactly the way he had envisioned it".

Release and reception 

An album launch party was held on 8 October 2008 at Two Temple Place in Temple, London, which was decorated for the occasion in the theme of the album. This was followed by a press conference given by Enya the next day at The Dorchester hotel. A second launch party was held on 3 November 2008 at the Grosse Orangerie Charlottenburg building in Berlin and featured dancers of the Berlin State Ballet performing choreography set to Enya songs.

And Winter Came... was released on 7 November 2008 by Warner Bros. Records internationally; its release in the United States was on 11 November 2008 by Reprise Records. The album debuted at number 6 on the UK Albums Chart, selling 35,812 copies in its first week. On 28 November 2008, the album was certified gold by the British Phonographic Industry (BPI) for 100,000 copies sold. The album also peaked at number 6 on the Billboard 200, with first-week sales of 92,000 copies. In its second week, the album sold 83,000 copies. It continued to sell, and received a gold certification from the Recording Industry Association of America on 12 December 2008 for sales in excess of 500,000 copies in the United States. By October 2015, this number had grown to 920,000. Elsewhere, the album reached the top 20 in 21 countries in its first three weeks. By late 2011, over three million copies of the album had been sold worldwide.

Enya released "Trains and Winter Rains" as the album's only physical single, in 10 November 2008. This was followed by the release of three album tracks for digital download: "White Is in the Winter Night" on 4 November 2008, "My! My! Time Flies!" on 4 February 2009, and "Dreams Are More Precious" on 10 October 2009.

The album was released on vinyl for the first time on 20 October 2017, in the United States.

Track listing 
All music composed by Enya; all lyrics by Roma Ryan; all songs produced by Nicky Ryan (except music and lyrics to "O Come, O Come, Emmanuel" and "Oíche Chiúin (Chorale)" are traditional, arr. Enya and Nicky Ryan).

Personnel
Credits are adapted from the album's 2008 liner notes.

Musicians
Enya – vocals, instrumentation
Pat Farrell – lead guitar, 12-string guitar on "My! My! Time Flies!"

Production
Enya – arranging
Nicky Ryan – arranging, engineering, mixing
Roma Ryan – lyrics
Tom Whalley – executive producer
Dick Beetham – mastering at Mastering 360, London
Daniel Polley – digital technical advisor
Simon Fowler – photography
Stylorouge – design, art direction

Charts

Weekly charts

Year-end charts

Certifications

 The album also peaked at number one on the Billboard Top Holiday Albums chart for a week and four weeks on the Top New Age Albums chart.
 The album peaked at No. 170 on the Billboard 200 chart in 2010.

Release history

See also
 List of Billboard Top Holiday Albums number ones of the 2000s

References

External links

Enya albums
Warner Records albums
2008 Christmas albums
Christmas albums by Irish artists
Celtic Christmas albums
New-age Christmas albums